Täglich Alles (German: Daily Everything) was a German-language daily tabloid newspaper published in Vienna, Austria, between 1992 and 2000.

History and profile
Täglich Alles was first published on 5 April 1992. The founder of the paper was Kurt Falk who also founded the weekly entertainment magazine Die Ganze Woche. Oswald Hicker served as the editor-in-chief of the daily, which had its headquarters in Vienna.

Täglich Alles was a tabloid paper which was described by Mari Pascua as a daily magazine. It mostly covered short and less detailed news stories and extensive photographs. The other characteristics of the paper were the use of big headlines, a colloquial language and the focus on sensational and gossip stories and scandals. On the other hand, it also expressed views about some significant political events and objected to the EU membership of Austria.

Täglich Alles had also a xenophobic discourse. In a study on political orientation of newspaper readers in Austria carried out in 1992 it was found that 46% of its readers had a xenophobic attitude.

Due to its political stance, particularly its opposition to the European Union, and sensationalist journalism the paper significantly lost advertising revenues. Täglich Alles ceased publication in August 2000.

Circulation
Täglich Alles had a circulation of 500,000 copies in 1993, making it the second best-selling paper in the country. In the period of 1995–1996 the paper had a circulation of 544,000 copies, making it the second best-selling paper after Neue Kronenzeitung. In 1997 Täglich Alles was one of four most read newspapers in Austria. In 1998 the paper sold nearly 390,000 daily copies.

References

1992 establishments in Austria
2000 disestablishments in Austria
Daily newspapers published in Austria
Defunct newspapers published in Austria
German-language newspapers published in Austria
Newspapers published in Vienna
Publications established in 1992
Publications disestablished in 2000